The Summit Steel Breeze is an American powered parachute, designed and produced by Summit Aerosports of Yale, Michigan. The aircraft is supplied as a kit for amateur construction or as a complete ready-to-fly aircraft.

Design and development
The Steel Breeze is intended as a light-sport aircraft compliant design. It features a parachute-style high-wing, two seats in tandem accommodation, tricycle landing gear and a single engine in pusher configuration. Engines available include the  Rotax 503, the  liquid-cooled Rotax 582, the  Hirth 3503 two-strokes and the four-stroke  HKS 700E.

The Steel Breeze's airframe is built from  TIG-welded, powder coated 4130 steel tubing. In-flight steering is accomplished via foot pedals that actuate the canopy brakes, creating roll and yaw. On the ground the aircraft has nosewheel steering controlled by a butterfly steering wheel and the main landing gear incorporates bungee suspension.

As of August 2012, the design does not appear on the Federal Aviation Administration's list of approved special light-sport aircraft.

Specifications (Steel Breeze)

References

External links

2000s United States ultralight aircraft
Single-engined pusher aircraft
Powered parachutes